The Kulaura–Shahbajpur line  railway is a metre-gauge railway line of Bangladesh under the eastern jurisdiction of Bangladesh Railway which crosses the Bangladesh border from Kulaura junction of Kulaura Upazila of Moulvibazar District to Mahisasan railway station in India via Shahbazpur in Barlekha Upazila of Moulvibazar District. Shahbajpur is the last railway station on the Bangladesh side of the Kulaura-Shahbazpur railway line. It was opened in 1910 on Kulaura–Shahbajpur line. Then Kulaura railway station became a junction station when Kulaura–Sylhet line railway was opened in 1912–15. But later in 2002, Kulaura–Shahbajpur line was abandoned as is closed in an unannounced manner. At present, this railway line is being renovated and made operational.

History
In response to the demands of the Assam tea planters for a railway link to Chittagong port, Assam Bengal Railway started construction of a railway track on the eastern side of Bengal in 1891. A  track between Chittagong and Comilla was opened to traffic in 1895. The Comilla–Akhaura–Kulaura–Badarpur section was opened in 1896–98 and extended to Lumding by 1903.

The Kulaura-Sylhet section was opened 1912–15, the Shaistaganj-Habiganj branch line in 1928, the Shaistaganj–Balla branch line in 1929 and the Sylhet–Chhatak Bazar line in 1954.

A metre gauge link exists between Shahbajpur in Bangladesh and Mahisasan in India.

References

Metre gauge railways in Bangladesh